Vincent Woods (born 1960) is an Irish poet and playwright.

His life
Woods was born in County Leitrim. He studied Journalism in the College of Commerce, Rathmines. Woods lived in the United States, New Zealand, and Australia and worked as a journalist with Raidió Teilifís Éireann (RTÉ), hosting The Arts Show on RTÉ Radio 1 until 1989, and then Arts Tonight. Woods' radio play, The Leitrim Hotel, won the P. J. O'Connor award for radio drama, and he also won The Stewart Parker Award for Drama in 1993.

His works
His poetry collections include Lives and Miracles and The Colour of Language. Woods is a member of Aosdána. His playwriting credits include A Cry from Heaven, At the Black Pig's Dyke, John Hughdy and Tom John, and Song of the Yellow Bittern.

He wrote songs for Irish singer Mary McPartlan for her album Petticoat Loose. The songs are "Sanctuary", "Kiss the Moon" and "Petticoat Loose."

References

External links
  A Lecture by Vincent Woods at Indiana University

1960 births
Living people
Aosdána members
Irish dramatists and playwrights
Irish male poets
Irish male dramatists and playwrights
Irish poets
People from County Leitrim
RTÉ newsreaders and journalists
RTÉ Radio 1 presenters
Alumni of Dublin Institute of Technology